The Alcántara Bridge (also known as Trajan's Bridge at Alcantara) is a Roman bridge  at Alcántara, in Extremadura, Spain.  Alcántara  is from the Arabic word al-Qantarah (القنطرة) meaning "the arch". The stone arch bridge was built over the Tagus River between 104 and 106 AD by an order of the Roman emperor Trajan in 98.

History 

The Alcántara Bridge has suffered more damage from war than from the elements over the years. The Moors destroyed one of the smallest arches in 1214 although this was rebuilt centuries later, in 1543, with stone taken from the original quarries. The second arch on the northwest side was then later destroyed in 1760 by the Spanish to stop the Portuguese advancing and was repaired in 1762 by Charles III, only to be blown up again in 1809 by Wellington's forces attempting to stop the French. Temporary repairs were made in 1819, but much of the bridge was destroyed yet again in 1836 by the Carlists.  The bridge was rebuilt in 1860 using mortared masonry. And following completion of the José María de Oriol Dam, which allowed for the draining of the Tagus riverbed, the main pillars were completely repaired in 1969.

Construction
The bridge's construction occurred in the ancient Roman province of Lusitania. In Ancient Rome, the costs of building and repairing bridges, known as opus pontis ("bridge work"), were the responsibility of multiple local municipalities. Their shared costs prove Roman bridges belonged to the region overall, and not to any one town (or two, if on a border). The Alcántara Bridge was built at the expense of 12 local municipalities in Lusitania. The names were added on an inscription on the archway over the central pier.

Gallery

See also 
 List of Roman bridges
 Roman temple of Alcántara
 Alcántara Dam

References

Further reading

External links 

 
 Puente de Alcántara sobre el Tajo, en Cáceres 
 Video of the bridge
 Video of Alcántara

Roman bridges in Spain
Deck arch bridges
Stone bridges in Spain
Bridges over the Tagus
Bridges in Extremadura
Trajan